Parachuting at the 2019 Military World Games was held in Wuhan, China from 18 to 25 October 2019.

Medal summary

Men

Women

References 
 2019 Military World Games Results - Page 183

Parachuting
2019